This is the videography of the South Korean boy band VIXX and their sub-unit VIXX LR, formed by Jellyfish Entertainment. Their notable group activities are listed below, as a whole, VIXX and VIXX LR has released a total of seventeen music videos, two video albums, and two seasons of a YouTube reality series titled VIXX TV.

Web series

VIXX TV
VIXX TV is an ongoing YouTube reality series that provides a different view of the members as they go about various activities, often showing a more lighthearted side of VIXX off stage, while also supplying fans and viewers with news and information about them. The episodes are uploaded onto the official VIXX YouTube Channel and include English subtitles. The first season of VIXX TV (stylized as VIXX TV1) consists of one hundred episodes that vary in length. The season ran from June 16, 2012 to May 27, 2014. The second season of VIXX TV (stylized as VIXX TV2) consists of 101 episodes that vary in length. The season began on September 17, 2014 and ended on May 3, 2019. The third season of VIXX TV (stylized as VIXX TV3) began from June 9, 2019 and is still ongoing, with episodes that vary in length.

Videography

Music videos

Video albums

Filmography
Note: For individual member's filmography, see their articles.

Reality shows

Drama

References

External links
 VIXX at Jellyfish Entertainment 
 VIXX Japan Official Site 
 

Videography
Videographies of South Korean artists